The Ukrainian Volunteer Army is a volunteer military formation established in December 2015 by Dmitry Yarosh after his departure from Right Sector movement. On October 14, 2018, Yarosh announced that all combat units were leaving the front line and the main focus of the Volunteer Army will be the construction of territorial defense units. As of 2022, the units are part of Ukrainian Territorial Defense, and they also maintain partisan units behind the enemy lines.

History

Founding 
With the breakout of the War in Eastern Ukraine in 2014, the right-wing ukrainian nationalist party Right Sector, know for its involvement in the Euromaidan, created the Ukrainian Volunteer Corps as a military response the rise of Pro-Russian separatist forces in the Donbas. The formation was led by the Right Sector's leader and founder Dmytro Yarosh.

On 11 November 2015, Yarosh and some of his associates announced they would be leaving the leadership of the Right Sector. On December of the same year, he announced the creation a new military formation, the Ukrainian Volunteer Army, using as basis some of units of the Volunteer Ukrainian Corps: the 5th and 8th Battalions and the Hospitallers Medical Battalion. The Ukrainian Volunteer Army would an independent military formation but would cooperate with the Ukrainian Armed Forces.

Combat history

War in Donbas 
In February 2016 , the Ukrainian Volunteer Army took part in the Battle of Avdiivka. As the 5th UDA Battalion UDA, together with the Ukrainian Ground Forces' 74th Reconnaissance Battalion conducted a combat operation, taking positions in the Avdiiv industrial zone and fighting control of a part of the Donetsk-Horlivka highway in the area of ​​the Yasynuvat junction.

In June 2016, the 8th Battalion UDA was deployed to Shyrokyne to fight the battle over the region, performing reconnaissance operations against local separatist forces.

On October 14, 2018 , during the celebration of the Defender of Ukraine Day in the city of Dnipro, the commander of the UDA Dmytro Yarosh announced that the 5th and 8th separate battalions of the Ukrainian Volunteer Army would be leaving the front line. In particular, he noted: "On this day, I announce that the 5th and 8th separate battalions of the Ukrainian Volunteer Army are leaving the front line, but we are not leaving the war. As long as the war continues, we will participate in it. Today, the most important task for the UDA is the construction of territorial defense units, which would have a clear functionality."

Russian invasion of 2022 
With the 2022 Russian invasion of Ukraine, Dmytro Yarosh mobilized the Ukrainian Volunteer Army to fight against the Russian invaders. The UDA has been expanded and reorganized into six battalions, the Hospitallers Medical Battalion, other three support battalions and a center for coordinating partisan operations.

During the summer and autumn, for several months, the main part of the units of the UDA were concentrated in the south of Ukraine, taking part of the Southern Ukraine campaign with both regular forces and partisans, including the counteroffensive in Kherson.

Ideology 
In 2021 political scientists Daniel Odin Shaw and Huseyn Aliyev described the UDA as holding a "generic form of Ukrainian ultranationalism", which allowed the inclusion of ethnic minorities.

Structure 
As of 2023, the army's structure is as follows:

 Ukrainian Volunteer Army
 Headquarters & Headquarters Company
 1st Battalion
 3rd Battalion
 5th Battalion
 7th Battalion Arey
 8th Battalion
 Hospitalers
 Black Fog Detachment
 Volyn Detachment
 Wolf Detachment
 Belarus Battalion
 Brakonyeriv Group
 Sheikh Mansur

Gallery

References 

Military units and formations of the 2022 Russian invasion of Ukraine
Ukrainian military formations
War in Donbas
2015 establishments in Ukraine
Ukrainian nationalism
Volunteer military formations of Ukraine